Maffia (Maffie or Mafie in Czech) was a secret organization acting during World War I. It was founded after emigration of Tomáš Garrigue Masaryk in 1914 by Czech politician Edvard Beneš, who later became second president of Czechoslovakia, and others main anti-royalist (Karel Kramář, Alois Rašín, Josef Scheiner and Přemysl Šámal).

Maffia was based on the principles of Sicilian Mafia (name "Maffia"); it was a central part of the First Czechoslovak Resistance and its main objective was to overthrow the Emperor of Austria and to cause the disintegration of his country. Maffia plot against Austria-Hungary and Central Powers was revealed by police in 1915; some members of Maffia (Karel Kramář, Alois Rašín, Vincent Červinka and Josef Zamazal) were arrested and sentenced to death (they were later amnestied by emperor Charles I.); Edvard Beneš escaped from Austria-Hungary to Switzerland in 3 September 1915,  but subversive activities of Maffia continued, under the leadership of Přemysl Šámal, until the end of the First World War. Maffia had over 200 members and it was supported from abroad (US, Italy etc.).

References

Czech nationalism
1910s in Austria-Hungary
20th century in Bohemia
Secret societies
World War I